Visa Para Un Sueño (English: Visa for a dream) is the third single by Dominican artist Juan Luis Guerra and his band 4:40 from their fourth studio album Ojalá Que Llueva Café. It was released in 1989 by Karem Records and a year later in Spain. The track is a merengue that provides a social commentary about the vicissitudes of obtaining a visa to travel to the United States to work, get better life conditions, escape of the poverty on the third world countries and the state of mind that many Dominicans has. The track was inspired on the illegal trips to Puerto Rico that many Dominicans take every year to find better living and working conditions.

The track is considered one of Guerra classic hits and is included on the artist every setlist tour since Ojala Que Llueva Cafe Tour (1990–91). The song reached the first places on some territories in Latin America and Peru national airplay. Eventually, the track receive moderate airplay on Spain in 1991. The track is included on the compilation Grandes Éxitos Juan Luis Guerra y 440 (1995). Also it was covered live on the albums A Son de Guerra Tour (2013) and Entre Mar y Palmeras (2021). Initially the track was released as a double single along with Como Abeja Al Panal in 1989. The track was released as a doble single along with Ojalá Que Llueva Café in Colombia and a B-side of La Gallera in Dominican Republic.

Tracklist 

 Dominican Republic 7", 45 RPM Single (1989)
 Side A: Visa Para Un Sueño
 Side B: Como Abeja Al Panal
 Spain 7", 45 RPM Single (1990)
 Visa Para Un Sueño
 La Gallera

Charts

References 

1989 singles
1989 songs
Juan Luis Guerra songs
Songs written by Juan Luis Guerra